Book of Bad Breaks is the third studio album by American indie rock band Thee More Shallows. It was released on Anticon on April 24, 2007.

Critical reception
At Metacritic, which assigns a weighted average score out of 100 to reviews from mainstream critics, the album received an average score of 69% based on 14 reviews, indicating "generally favorable reviews".

Marisa Brown of AllMusic gave the album 3.5 stars out of 5, saying: "There's a fair amount of experimentalism, with plenty of synthesized and effected sounds, songs breaking in and out of themselves from time to time, intermissions that lead into full pieces which then fade halfway through and become something else before returning to what they were originally." Dave Kerr of The Skinny gave the album 4 stars out of 5, saying: "Despite the haunting, downtrodden poetry in these lyrics, optimism and vitality shines brightly throughout the Shallows' sound."

Track listing

References

External links
 

2007 albums
Thee More Shallows albums
Anticon albums